Alpoca is an unincorporated community in Wyoming County, West Virginia, United States, along Barkers Creek and West Virginia Route 10. The Alpoca Post Office  has been closed.

References

External links

Unincorporated communities in West Virginia
Unincorporated communities in Wyoming County, West Virginia
Coal towns in West Virginia